Qaşaltı Qaraqoyunlu ( or simply ) is a village and municipality in the Goranboy District of Azerbaijan. It has a population of 721.

References 

Populated places in Goranboy District